Pošte Srpske (officially ) is one of three companies responsible for postal service in Bosnia and Herzegovina. The other two are BH Pošta and Hrvatska pošta Mostar. Pošte Srpske operates in Republika Srpska. Before the war conflicts in Bosnia and Herzegovina, Post Yugoslavia was responsible for postal services on the territory of SR BiH. However, at the beginning of the war in Bosnia and Herzegovina, the postal system in Bosnia and Herzegovina fell apart. At the beginning, there were frequent occurrences of armed attacks on Post Office vehicles and roadblocks, which made it impossible to carry out postal exchange.

References

External links
 

Communications in Bosnia and Herzegovina
Companies of Bosnia and Herzegovina
Companies based in Banja Luka
Bosnia and Herzegovina
Philately of Bosnia and Herzegovina
Economy of Republika Srpska
Government-owned companies of Bosnia and Herzegovina